Six Feet Down Under is a limited edition commemorative live EP by the American heavy metal band Metallica. It was released exclusively in Australia and New Zealand on September 20, 2010, through Universal Music. It has been sold by Trans-Tasman record stores, Metallica online store and iTunes only. The EP contains fan recordings of eight live songs from the band's archive that were never released (two songs from each Australian tour).

Track listing

Personnel
 James Hetfield - lead vocals, rhythm guitar
 Lars Ulrich - drums
 Kirk Hammett - lead guitar, backing vocals
 Jason Newsted - bass, backing vocals on tracks 1–6
 Robert Trujillo - bass, backing vocals on tracks 7–8

References

2010 EPs
Metallica EPs
Live EPs
2010 live albums
Metallica live albums
Universal Music Group EPs
Universal Music Group live albums